Şirvanlı or Shirvanly may refer to:
Şirvanlı, Agdam, Azerbaijan
Şirvanlı, Barda, Azerbaijan
Şirvanlı, Neftchala, Azerbaijan
Şirvanlı, Oghuz, Azerbaijan